Qernertuarssuit is an abandoned settlement in northwestern Greenland, located on one of the Qeqertat skerries in Uummannaq Fjord north of Salleq Island.

References

Former populated places in Greenland
Uummannaq Fjord